A bottle garden is a type of closed terrarium in which plants are grown. They usually consist of a plastic or glass bottle with a narrow neck and a small opening. Plants are grown inside the bottle with little or no exposure to the outside environment and can be contained indefinitely inside the bottle if properly illuminated. The oldest bottle garden in existence is alleged to have been planted in 1960, and to have remained sealed from 1972 until at least 2013.

Uses
Bottle gardens are commonly used as a form of decoration, or as a substitute garden in areas with little space, such as patios or high rise apartments. Being easy to create and maintain, bottle gardens are also used in schools as an economical way to study miniature eco-systems within the confines of a classroom. They can also be used as a control mechanism, enabling the internal environment of the bottle to be effectively controlled and isolated from outside stimuli. Bottle gardens have also been used for vegetable production in dryland areas and areas with a shortage of water, allowing water to be conserved for other uses.

Operation

A bottle garden has the essential requirements of soil, water, and light for the survival of plants that are housed in it, as well as a reservoir of water, as water is trapped inside the bottle and unable to evaporate. The carbon dioxide from plant respiration is used for photosynthesis, and the oxygen from photosynthesis is used for respiration. As such they require almost no maintenance.

See also

 Biosphere
 Closed ecological system
Wardian case

References

External links 

Types of garden